Dorcadion septemlineatum is a species of beetle in the family Cerambycidae. It was described by Waltl in 1838. It is known from Turkey, and possibly Bulgaria and Greece.

Subspecies
 Dorcadion septemlineatum abanti Braun, 1976
 Dorcadion septemlineatum demirciense Breuning, 1966
 Dorcadion septemlineatum novemlineatum Kraatz, 1873
 Dorcadion septemlineatum octolineatum Kraatz, 1873
 Dorcadion septemlineatum septemlineatum Waltl, 1838

References

septemlineatum
Beetles described in 1838